Martie Gail Haselton (born 1970) is an American psychologist and professor of psychology at the University of California, Los Angeles, where she holds positions in the Department of Psychology, Department of Communication Studies, and the Institute for Society and Genetics. Her research is in the field of evolutionary psychology, particularly as it relates to human sexual behavior and intimate relationships.

References

External links
UCLA personal website
Department of Psychology faculty page
Department of Communication faculty page

Living people
1970 births
American women psychologists
University of California, Los Angeles faculty
University of San Diego alumni
College of William & Mary alumni
University of Texas at Austin alumni
Evolutionary psychologists